Alec Brook-Krasny (born March 2, 1958) is an American politician serving in the New York State Assembly representing the 46th district. He was a member of the Democratic Party, and was elected on November 7, 2006, to represent the 46th District, which covers the neighborhoods of Bath Beach, Bay Ridge, Brighton Beach, Coney Island, Dyker Heights, and Seagate, in Brooklyn. He resigned on July 7, 2015. Brook-Krasny was arrested on charges of felony healthcare fraud in 2017, but was not convicted.

In 2022, Brook-Krasny announced that he was joining the Republican party and running for the State Assembly once again. He was elected and is again a member of the Assembly.

Early life and career
Brook-Krasny immigrated to the United States in 1989 from Moscow, where he had graduated from the Moscow Institute of Consumer Technology (currently the Russian State University for Tourism and Services) in 1983. After several years in New York City, he became a manager and started a children's entertainment and community center called Funorama, in Brighton Beach, Brooklyn.

Political career
Brook-Krasny's first political campaign was in 2000 for the New York State Assembly. In 2001, he ran for the New York City Council. Although he won the endorsement of The New York Times, he lost the election to Domenic M. Recchia, Jr. 

In 2006, State Assemblywoman Adele Cohen retired and Brook-Krasny declared his candidacy for her position. He won the Democratic primary election, with 3,101 votes to Kagan's 2,958, and then won the general election over the Republican candidate, Patricia B. Laudano, 10,423 to 4,139 votes.

Brook-Krasny was reelected to his assembly seat in 2008, 2010, 2012, and 2014. During his tenure, he served on the Housing, Aging, Cities, Election Law, and Governmental Employees Committees. On June 11, 2015, he announced his resignation from the assembly effective July 7, to work in the private sector. He was succeeded by Pamela Harris, who was selected as the Democratic nominee by a party committee and then won the special general election in November. Harris, like Brook-Krasny, would later face criminal charges and she was succeeded by Mathylde Frontus in 2018. 

In the year 2022, Brook-Krasny announced that he is joining the Republican Party and ending his membership with the Democratic Party. He ran for the New York State Assembly again as a Republican, successfully defeating Frontus.

Criminal charges

Arrest 
In 2017, as part of "Operation Avalanche", Brook-Krasny was arrested on charges of healthcare fraud. He was indicted along with eight other individuals and corporate entities with schemes to illegally sell prescriptions for over 3.7 million opioid painkillers, to defraud Medicaid and Medicare of millions of dollars and to commit money laundering through two Brooklyn medical clinics owned by Lazar Feygin. Feygin pleaded guilty to 16 charges including conspiracy, criminal sale of a prescription and health care fraud.

Acquittal, Hung Jury and Dropped Charges 
After a trial that lasted two months, on July 25, 2019 Brook-Krasny was found not guilty of five felony charges of conspiracy, health care fraud, and scheming to defraud the state.  A mistrial was declared on the other three misdemeanor commercial bribery charges after the jury could not reach a verdict. Remaining charges against Alec Brook-Krasny were dismissed on Dec 2, 2019 on the grounds that New York's Special Narcotics Prosecutor lost jurisdiction over the case after it no longer had drug-related charges.

References

1958 births
Jewish American state legislators in New York (state)
American people of Russian-Jewish descent
Russian Jews
Democratic Party members of the New York State Assembly
Living people
Politicians from Brooklyn
New York (state) politicians convicted of crimes
Soviet emigrants to the United States
21st-century American politicians
21st-century American Jews